Kirpichny is a settlement in Tikhoretsky District of Krasnodar Krai. Population: 

The settlement consists of two main streets Alekseevskaya, and Kirpichnaya.

References

Rural localities in Krasnodar Krai